William Chapman Sharpe is an American literary scholar. He is a professor of English at Barnard College.

Biography 
Sharpe received his B.A. and Ph.D. from Columbia University and M.A. from the University of Oxford. He joined the faculty of Barnard College in 1983, and his scholarship focuses on the art, culture, and literature of the modern cities, especially New York City. He has written about subjects such as shadows or nighttime environments of cities as depicted in literature and arts as well as a cultural history on walking.

Sharpe received a Guggenheim Fellowship in 1993.

References 

Living people
Columbia College (New York) alumni
Columbia Graduate School of Arts and Sciences alumni
Barnard College faculty
Literary scholars
Alumni of the University of Oxford
Year of birth missing (living people)